David Dowd is an American football coach and former player. He was the first head football coach at Charleston Southern University in North Charleston, South Carolina, serving from 1991 to 2002, compiling a record of 34–94.

Since leaving collegiate coaching, Dowd has served in a number of coaching roles in South Carolina high schools.

Head coaching record

References

1952 births
Living people
American football quarterbacks
Charleston Southern Buccaneers football coaches
Gardner–Webb Runnin' Bulldogs football coaches
Gardner–Webb Runnin' Bulldogs football players
Guilford Quakers football players
High school football coaches in South Carolina
North Carolina A&T State University alumni
Players of American football from Greensboro, North Carolina
Players of American football from Raleigh, North Carolina
Coaches of American football from North Carolina